The Compaq Cup is a One Day International cricket tournament which held in Sri Lanka from 8 September to 14 September 2009. The series involved the national teams of India, Sri Lanka and New Zealand.

Squads

Matches

Group stage

Sri lanka won the toss and elected to bat first 

New Zealand won the toss and elected to bat first

Final

Media coverage
Television
Arab Digital Distribution (live) – Middle East
Ten Sports (live) – India, Sri Lanka and Pakistan
DD National (live) – India (only India matches)

References

2009 in Sri Lankan cricket
International cricket competitions in 2009
New Zealand cricket tours of Sri Lanka
Indian cricket tours of Sri Lanka
Sri Lankan cricket seasons from 2000–01
2009 in Indian cricket
2009 in New Zealand cricket